
Year 339 BC was a year of the pre-Julian Roman calendar. At the time it was known as the Year of the Consulship of Mamercinus and Philo (or, less frequently, year 415 Ab urbe condita). The denomination 339 BC for this year has been used since the early medieval period, when the Anno Domini calendar era became the prevalent method in Europe for naming years.

Events 
 By place 

 Greece 
 Philip II of Macedon decides to attack the Scythians, using as an excuse their reluctance to allow Philip to dedicate a statue of Heracles at the Danube estuary. The two armies clash on the plains of modern-day Dobruja. The ninety-year-old King of the Scythians, Ateas, is killed during the battle and his army is routed.
 During a meeting of the Amphictyonic Council, Philip accuses the citizens of the town of Amfissa, in Locris, of intruding on consecrated ground. The Amphictyonic Congress, with the initial support of the Athenian representative, Aeschines, decides to inflict a harsh punishment upon the Locrians. After the failure of a first military excursion against the Locrians, the summer session of the Amphictyonic Council gives command of the league's forces to Philip and asks him to lead a second excursion. Philip acts at once, and his forces pass through Thermopylae, enter Amfissa and defeat the Locrians who are led by Chares, the Athenian general and mercenary commander.
 Xenocrates is elected as head of the Greek Academy replacing Speusippus.

 Roman Republic 
 The Roman consul Titus Manlius Imperiosus Torquatus defeats the Latins in the Battle of Trifanum.

Births 
 Alexinus, Greek philosopher of Elis (approximate date)

Deaths 
 Speusippus, head of Plato's Academy (b. 407 BC)
 Ateas, king of the Scythians (b. c. 429 BC)

References